Baingoin County is a county within Nagqu of the Tibet Autonomous Region.

County got the name from the lake Drang-khog which is in center of county. County lies between lakes Namtso and Siling.

The county is divided into ten towns and townships:
 Pubao Town (Pubao-zhen ) 
 Baoji Township (Baoji-xiang )   
 Beila Town (Beila-zhen )   
 Jiaqiong Town (Jiaqiong-zhen )  
 Dechen Town (Deqing-zhen )  
 Maqian Township (Maqian-xiang )  
 Mentang Raktsek Township (Mendang-xiang )   
 Qinglong Township (Qinglong-xiang )  
 Xênkyêr Township (Xinjixiang )  
 Nyima Township (Nima-xiang  )

Climate

References

Counties of Tibet
Nagqu